Studdal may refer to the following places in Kent, England:

East Studdal
West Studdal